Abdolabad (also Romanized as ‘Abdolābād) is a village in and capital of Howmeh Rural District, in the Central District of Mahvelat County, Razavi Khorasan Province, Iran. At the 2006 census, its population was 5,561, in 1,435 families.

See also 

 List of cities, towns and villages in Razavi Khorasan Province

References 

Populated places in Mahvelat County